Shatt Al-Arab District is a district of Basra Governorate, Iraq. Its seat is the village of Al-Harita.

Districts of Basra Province